A  (plural: kippot), skullcap, or  is a brimless cap, usually made of cloth, traditionally worn by Jewish males to fulfill the customary requirement that the head be covered. It is worn by all men in Orthodox Jewish communities during prayers and by most Orthodox Jewish men at all other times. Among non-Orthodox Jewish communities, some who wear them do so at all times, while  others wear them only during prayer, while attending a synagogue, or in other rituals.  Women may also wear them in those communities.

Etymology 
The term  literally means "dome", as the kippah is worn on the head like a dome. 
The Yiddish term  might be derived from the Polish  or the Ukrainian , perhaps ultimately from Medieval Latin  ("cowl, hood").

Jewish law 

According to the Rambam, Jewish law dictates that a man is required to cover his head during prayer.

In non-Orthodox communities, some women also wear , and people have different customs about when to wear a when eating, praying, studying Jewish texts, or entering a sacred space such as a synagogue or cemetery. The Reform movement has historically been opposed to wearing , but in recent years it has become more common and accepted for Reform men and women to cover their heads during prayer and Jewish study.

God). The 17th-century authority David HaLevi Segal holds that the reason is to enforce the Halakhic rule to avoid practices unique to Gentiles. Since, he points out, Europeans are accustomed to go bare-headed, and their priests insist on officiating with bare heads, this constitutes a uniquely Gentile practice, and therefore Jews would be prohibited from behaving similarly.

In a recent responsum, former Sephardic Chief Rabbi of Israel Ovadia Yosef ruled that it should be worn to show affiliation with the religiously observant community.

The Talmud states, "Cover your head in order that the fear of heaven may be upon you." Rabbi Hunah ben Joshua never walked four cubits with his head uncovered. He explained: "Because the Divine Presence is always over my head." This was understood by Rabbi Yosef Karo in the Shulchan Arukh as indicating that Jewish men should cover their heads, and should not walk more than four cubits bareheaded. The  modifies this ruling, adding that the Achronim established a requirement to wear a head covering even when traversing fewer than four cubits, and even when one is standing still, indoors and outside. Kitzur Shulchan Aruch cites a story from the Talmud (tractate Shabbat 156b) about Rav Nachman bar Yitzchak, who might have become a thief had his mother not saved him from this fate by insisting that he cover his head, which instilled in him the fear of God.

The Talmud implies that unmarried men did not wear a :

The Tanakh implies that covering one's head is a sign of mourning:

The argument for the  has two sides. In the 21st century, there has been an effort to suppress earlier sources that practiced this leniency, including erasing lenient responsa from newly published books. Or Zarua (13th century) wrote that "our rabbis in France" customarily made blessings while bareheaded, but he criticized this practice.

According to 20th-century Rabbi Isaac Klein, a male Conservative Jew ought to cover his head when in the synagogue, at prayer or sacred study, when engaging in a ritual act, and when eating. In the mid-19th century, Reformers led by Isaac Wise completely rejected the  after an altercation in which Rabbi Wise's  was knocked off his head. Nowadays, almost all Conservative synagogues require men to wear a head covering (usually a ), but in Reform synagogues there is no requirement. However,  may be provided to anybody who wishes to wear them.

Types and variation 

In the Middle Ages in Europe, the distinctive Jewish headgear was the Jewish hat, a full hat with a brim and a central point or stalk. Originally used by choice among Jews to distinguish themselves, it was later made compulsory by Christian governments in some places as a discriminatory measure. In the early 19th century in the United States, rabbis often wore a scholar's cap (large saucer-shaped caps of cloth, like a beret) or a Chinese skullcap. Other Jews of this era wore black pillbox-shaped .

Often, the color and fabric of the  can be a sign of adherence to a specific religious movement, particularly in Israel. They also wear suede or leather . Knitted  were first made in the late 1940s, and became popular after being worn by Rabbi Moshe-Zvi Neria. Members of most Haredi groups wear black velvet or cloth .

More recently,  have been observed made in the colors of sports teams, especially football. In the United States, children's  featuring cartoon characters or themes such as Star Wars have become popular; in response to this trend, some Jewish schools have banned  with characters that do not conform to traditional Jewish values.  have been inscribed on the inside as a souvenir for a celebration (bar/bat mitzvah or wedding).  for women are also being made and worn. These are sometimes made of beaded wire to seem more feminine. A special baby  has two strings on each side to fasten it and is often used in a  ceremony.

Head coverings in ancient Israelite culture 
The Israelites might have worn a headdress similar to that worn by the Bedouins, but it is unknown whether a fixed type of headdress was used. That the headdress of the Israelites might have been in the  style may be inferred from the use of the noun  (the verb  meaning "to roll like a ball", Isaiah 22:18) and by the verb  ("to wind", compare Ezekiel 16:10; Jonah 2:6). As to the form of such turbans, nothing is known, and they may have varied according to the different classes of society. This was customary with the Assyrians and Babylonians, for example, whose fashions likely influenced the costume of the Israelites—particularly during and after the Babylonian Exile.

Civil legal issues 

In Goldman v. Weinberger, 475 U.S. 503 (1986), the United States Supreme Court ruled in a 5–4 decision that active military members were required to remove the  indoors, citing uniform regulations that state only armed security police may keep their heads covered while indoors.

Congress passed the Religious Apparel Amendment after a war story from the 1983 Beirut barracks bombing about the "camouflage " of Jewish Navy Chaplain Arnold Resnicoff was read into the Congressional Record. Catholic Chaplain George Pucciarelli tore off a piece of his Marine Corps uniform to replace Resnicoff's  when it had become blood-soaked after being used to wipe the faces of wounded Marines after the 1983 Beirut barracks bombing. This amendment was eventually incorporated into U.S. Department of Defense (DOD) regulations on the "Accommodation of Religious Practices Within the Military Services".

This story of the "camouflage " was re-told at many levels, including a keynote speech by President Ronald Reagan to the Baptist Fundamentalism Annual Convention in 1984, and another time during a White House meeting between Reagan and the American Friends of Lubavitch.

Passage of the Religious Apparel Amendment and the subsequent DOD regulations were followed in 1997 by the passing of the Religious Freedom Restoration Act (RFRA). However, the Supreme Court struck down RFRA as beyond Congress' powers to bind the states in the 1997 case City of Boerne v. Flores. RFRA is constitutional as applied to the Federal government, as seen in Gonzales v. O Centro Espirita Beneficente Uniao do Vegetal.

The Religious Land Use and Institutionalized Persons Act of 2000 (RLUIPA), 114 Stat. 804, 42 U. S. C. §2000cc-1(a)(1)-(2), upheld as constitutional in Cutter v. Wilkinson, 44 U.S. 709 (2005), requires by inference that Orthodox Jewish prisoners be reasonably accommodated in their request to wear .

The provincial government of Quebec, Canada passed "An Act respecting the laicity of the State" in June 2019, which prohibits the wearing of "religious symbols" by government employees including teachers, police officers, judges, prosecutors, and members of certain commissions.

Wearing by non-Jews

They are also often provided at bereavement events and at Jewish cemeteries. According to the Conservative Committee on Jewish Law and Standards, there is no halakhic reason to require a non-Jew to cover their head, but it is recommended that non-Jews be asked to wear a  where ritual or worship is being conducted, both out of respect for the Jewish congregation and as a gesture of respect including the non-Jewish guest.

 were adopted as a symbol by some of the non-Jewish African American marchers in the 1965 Selma to Montgomery marches, most prominently by James Bevel.

See also 
 , a similar Muslim skullcap
 Zucchetto
 The Philippi Collection
 Kid Yamaka, Jewish American boxer
 Knit cap
 , an Israeli television show named after the knit  worn by Religious Zionists

Notes

References

External links

Jewish ritual objects
Jewish religious clothing
Non-clerical religious clothing
Religious headgear
Middle Eastern clothing
History of Asian clothing
Jewish life cycle
Articles containing video clips
Hebrew words and phrases in Jewish law